Marc Kielburger   (born 1977) is a Canadian author, social entrepreneur, columnist, humanitarian and activist for children's rights. He is the co-founder, along with his brother Craig, of the We Movement, which consists of the WE Charity, an international development and youth empowerment organization; Me to We, a for-profit company selling lifestyle products, leadership training and travel experience; and We Day, an annual youth empowerment event. In 2010, he was named a member of the Order of Canada by the Governor General of Canada.

Early years and education 
Kielburger was born in 1977 to schoolteachers Fred and Theresa Kielburger. At age 13, he became involved in environmental activism, founding clubs, starting petitions and eventually becoming the youngest person ever to receive the Ontario Medal for Good Citizenship. He traveled to Jamaica on a school program, where he volunteered at a hospice for teenage mothers and at a leper colony. In 1990, Kielburger won the award for Best Junior Project at the Canada-Wide Science Fair, going on to win another CWSF award in 1992.

Kielburger attended  Brebeuf College School Toronto and Neuchâtel Junior College in Switzerland, graduating from both in 1995. In the same year, he was named a Jostens Loran Scholar and enrolled in Ottawa University before transferring to Harvard University, where he received a degree in International Relations.In 2000, he was awarded a Rhodes Scholarship and attended Oxford University, where he received a law degree with an emphasis on human rights law.

Activism and social entrepreneurship 
While Marc Kielburger was studying at Harvard, his younger brother Craig read a story in the newspaper about the murder of a former child labourer in Pakistan. The story inspired Craig to urge world leaders to oppose the practice of child labour. In 1995, Craig and Marc co-founded Free the Children (later renamed We Charity). Marc's work with Free the Children has included co-creating Me to We, a social enterprise organization that supports We Charity with half its profits, and We Day, an annual youth empowerment event held in large stadiums in cities across Canada, the U.S. and the U.K. Kielburger later co-founded Leaders Today, an organization that trains young people to develop skills and confidence to effect social change.

In 2008, the Kielburgers appeared on the Oprah Winfrey Show where they launched a partnership with Oprah's Angel Network.

Kielburger's work has been recognized through an Ashoka fellowship. He was also named Most Admired CEO in Canada in the Public Sector 2015.

Kielburger is a member of the board of directors of Prince's Trust Canada and Freshii. Kielburger also contributes a column to The Globe and Mail.

On 9 September 2020, We Charity announced that it was winding down its operations in Canada and selling its assets to establish an endowment that will help sustain ongoing We Charity projects around the world.  The announcement also explains that the existing board of directors, the existing Canadian employees, and the Kielburgers would leave We Charity Canada.  The decision to wind down its Canadian operations were attributed to the financial condition of the organization caused by the WE Charity scandal and COVID-19.

Controversy and criticism 

In June 2020, the Canadian government announced it had chosen We Charity to run its new Canada Student Service Grant program. The selection of We Charity led to accusations of favouritism, since the government would be outsourcing a massive federal aid program to a private organization with ties to Canadian Prime Minister Justin Trudeau and his family. In July 2020, Marc Kielburger and fellow We Charity co-founder Craig Kielburger announced they were pulling out of the grant contract due to the controversy it created.

On 30 June 2020, the Canadian Press published a video of Marc Kielburger telling youth leaders earlier in the month that Trudeau's office had contacted We Charity to see if the organization would administer the student aid program. Kielburger later said that he had mistakenly referred to the Prime Minister's Office. The Prime Minister's Office also denied direct contact with WE Charity. Kielburger said the outreach came instead from officials at Employment and Social Development Canada.

In June 2020, Amanda Maitland, a former We Charity employee, said a speech she had written for a We Charity event about her experiences as a black woman was edited without her approval by a group of mostly white staff members. Maitland said when she tried to speak up at a staff meeting about problems within the organization, Marc Kielburger quickly ended the discussion. In July 2020, Marc and Craig Kielburger apologized to Maitland on their personal Instagram accounts.

Personal life 
Kielburger is married to Roxanne Joyal. She is a Rhodes Scholar and a fellow Member of the Order of Canada. They have two daughters.

Publications 
 Kielburger, Craig; Kielburger, Marc (2002). Take Action! A Guide to Active Citizenship. John Wiley & Sons. . OCLC 51566318.
 Kielburger, Marc (2004). Take More Action. Thomson Nelson. .
 Kielburger, Craig; Kielburger, Marc (2004). Me To We: Turning Self-Help on Its Head. John Wiley & Sons. . OCLC 55510177.
 Kielburger, Craig; Kielburger, Marc (2006). Me To We: Finding Meaning In A Material World. Fireside. . OCLC 71126899.
 Singh, Lekha; Kielburger, Marc (2007). The making of an activist. Friesens Corporation. . OCLC 319758042.
 Kielburger, Craig; Kielburger, Marc (2010). Global Voices. Greystone Books. .
 Kielburger, Craig; Branson, Holly; Kielburger, Marc (2018). WEconomy: You Can Find Meaning, Make A Living, and Change the World. John Wiley & Sons. .

Further reading 
 Coleman, Linda S.; Funk, Robert W. (2005). "Take Action: Children's Rights Are Human Rights: Marc Kielburger and Craig Keilburger". Professional and Public Writing: A Rhetoric and Reader for Advanced Composition. Pearson Education. p. 158. .
 "Young People Changing the World: An Interview with Marc Kielburger". A Human Future. L'Arche Canada. 6 (March 2007). 2007.
 Asabere-Ameyaw, Akwasi; Anamuah-Mensah, Jophus; Sefa Dei, George; Raheem, Kolawole, eds. (2014). "Me to We". Indigenist African Development and Related Issues: Towards a Transdisciplinary Perspective. Sense Publishers. p. 48.  – via Google Books.
 Dutton, Jane E.; Spreitzer, Gretchen M. (2014). "Cultivate Hope". How to Be a Positive Leader: Small Actions, Big Impact. Berrett-Koehler Publishers, Inc. p. 125. .
 Scudamore, Brian (October 18, 2017). "WE Co-Founder Marc Kielburger On Mentors, Mandela, And Spurring Social Change At 17". Forbes. Archived from the original on October 18, 2017. Retrieved January 21, 2019.

References

External links 
 Marc Kielburger profile on Me to We Marc
 "Marc Kielburger". World Economic Forum. Marc Kielburger

1977 births
Activists from Ontario
Canadian activists
Canadian humanitarians
Canadian Rhodes Scholars
Canadian Roman Catholics
Children's rights activists
Living people
Members of the Order of Canada
Harvard University alumni
People from Thornhill, Ontario
Youth empowerment people
Alumni of University College, Oxford
Toronto Star people
Writers from Ontario
Social entrepreneurs
Canadian lawyers
Canadian child activists
WE Charity